Chen Feng-Min (born 29 October 1977) is a Taiwanese baseball player who competed in the 2008 Summer Olympics.

References

1977 births
Living people
Baseball players from Tainan
Olympic baseball players of Taiwan
Baseball players at the 2008 Summer Olympics
Asian Games medalists in baseball
Baseball players at the 2006 Asian Games
Asian Games gold medalists for Chinese Taipei
Medalists at the 2006 Asian Games